Glorimar Montalvo Castro (born February 14, 1979), also known as la Gata Gangster, is a Puerto Rican reggaeton singer.

Music career 
Glory has one of reggaeton's most recognized female voices. During her career to date, she has collaborated in the productions of artists such as Daddy Yankee ("Gasolina"), Luny Tunes y Noriega (La Gata Suelta), Don Omar ("Dale Don Dale", La Traicionera, Suelta Como Gabete, La Loba), Héctor & Tito ("Baila morena"), Eddie Dee (Donde Hubo Fuego) and others. Listeners may recognize Glory by her distinctive moaning sounds in many reggaeton songs. She formed part of the famed "La Industria" or DJ Eric Industry. She collaborated on some of the early underground cassettes distributed among the Puerto Rican population, which include: Street Style 1, Street Style 2, and DJ Eric Industry Volumes 1-5.

Glory is known to audiences in Central and South America, Spain and the United States. One of her most recent hits was "La Popola", which was even banned from some countries for its sexual content. In 2005, she released her debut CD Glou, which, according to the official website, sold over 100,000 copies in Latin America.

The singles "Perreo 101" and "La Traicionera" with Don Omar are two of her best-known hits. A new version of "La Popola" together with fellow-rapper Valentino (of the duo Magnate & Valentino) was also released, entitled "A Popolera".

Discography

Albums 

2005: Glou

Singles 
 La Popola
 Perreo 101
 Suelta Como Gabete
 La Traicionera (featuring Don Omar)
 Ahora Me Rio Yo (featuring Voltio)
 Duro 2013
 Soy

Other songs 
 Noche Loca
 Torque
 La Popola
 Piedra Papel Tijera
 Vamos A Perrearnos
 Hagamos El Amor
 Las Gatas Activa
 Hay Algo En Ti
 La Bandolera
 El Mani
 Chouchianna

Other 
Collaborations
 "Gasolina" (Daddy Yankee featuring Glory)
 "No Me Dejes Solo" (Daddy Yankee featuring Wisin & Yandel and Glory)
 Machete (Daddy Yankee featuring Glory)
 Castigo (Ranking Stone featuring Glory)
 Gata Celosa (Magnate & Valentino featuring Héctor & Tito and Glory)
 "Baila Morena" (Héctor & Tito featuring Don Omar & Glory)
 Quisiera (Luny Tunes y Noriega featuring Jon Erick, LaRoca Osorio and Glory)
 Donde Hubo Fuego (Daddy Yankee featuring Valerie & Glory)

Music videos
 (Suelta Como) Gabete
 Acelera
 Lento/Un Paso
 Gata Gargola
 La Popola

Albums appearances

Filmography

References 

1979 births
Living people
People from Santurce, Puerto Rico
Singers from San Juan, Puerto Rico
21st-century Puerto Rican women singers
Puerto Rican reggaeton musicians